Idolators is a 1917 American silent drama film directed by Walter Edwards and starring Louise Glaum, George Webb, and Dorcas Matthews.

Cast
 Louise Glaum as Viola Strathmore
 George Webb as Curtis de Forest Ralston
 Dorcas Matthews as Anita Carew
 Lee Hill as Borul
 Tom Guise as Burr Britton 
 Hugo B. Koch as Bruce Winthrope 
 Milton Ross as Oscar Brent

References

Bibliography
 Robert B. Connelly. The Silents: Silent Feature Films, 1910-36, Volume 40, Issue 2. December Press, 1998.

External links

1917 films
1917 drama films
1910s English-language films
American silent feature films
Silent American drama films
American black-and-white films
Triangle Film Corporation films
Films directed by Walter Edwards
1910s American films